This is a list of 179 public school districts in the U.S. state of Colorado.

Footnotes:

See also

Outline of Colorado
Index of Colorado-related articles
 Education in Colorado
 School district
 State of Colorado
 Colorado Department of Education
 List of colleges and universities in Colorado
 Table of Colorado charter schools
 :Category:School districts in Colorado

References

External links
 State of Colorado
 Colorado Department of Education

 
School divisions
Colorado